Diner Dash: Flo on the Go is the third installment to the game series Diner Dash. It is published by PlayFirst and was released on October 1, 2006.

Gameplay

Plot 
Flo and her friend Darla go on a vacation. However, whilst boarding the ship, Flo's suitcase containing her clothes accidentally falls overboard. As the pair eat at the on-board restaurant, a waiter slips, dropping his tray. Flo catches it, and the manager comments that she "looks like she's handled a tray before". Flo explains that she owns a restaurant, and so does Darla, and since the crew is short-handed, the manager asks Flo to work for the ship's crew. In return, the manager offers to refund their tickets, as well as pay them for their services. Using the money from this offer, Flo plans to buy herself some new clothes on the on-board store. The vacation takes the pair through the cruise, riding the rails, exploring the deep, waiting tables in the sky, and into the reaches of space.

Reception
Pocket Gamer gave the Java ME version of Flo on the Go an overall score of 8 out of 10, calling it "an addictive and absorbing game" and praised its gameplay and graphics, but criticized some control issues that impeded the game's time-sensitive gameplay.

Sequel 
Following Flo On The Go, PlayFirst released a Diner Dash spin-off called Wedding Dash. The next official Diner Dash game entitled Diner Dash: Hometown Hero was subsequently released in 2007.

References

External links 
 Official Site
 Official game series site
 Official game series site (old)
 

2007 video games
Games built with Playground SDK
J2ME games
BlackBerry games
MacOS games
Nintendo DS games
Video games about food and drink
Video games developed in the United States
Video games featuring female protagonists
Windows games
PlayFirst games